Eriphiidae is a family of crabs, comprising three genera:
Eriphia Latreille, 1817
Eriphides Rathbun, 1897
Globopilumnus Balss, 1933

References

Eriphioidea
Decapod families